Otis Griffin (born August 22, 1977) is an American professional boxer and ranked light heavyweight contender.

Professional career
Griffin fought on several major undercards and has been featured on ESPN. He captured the NABO light heavyweight championship with a technical knockout over unbeaten prospect Mike Nevitt. In July 2007, Griffin lost by a technical knockout to light heavyweight champion Danny Green of the World Boxing Association at Challenge Stadium in Perth, Australia. Green dropped Griffin three times before the bout was stopped. In 2008 he was stopped in the 11th round by former contender Jesse Brinkley. Griffin went on to a controversial loss against Jeff Lacey. In May 2010 Griffin won a USBA title belt after he knocked out former WBA super middleweight world champion Byron Mitchell.

The Next Great Champ
Griffin was a contestant on the reality TV show The Next Great Champ on Fox. Although he lost an earlier bout on the show, Griffin was given another chance and after winning several bouts on the program, he was proclaimed the winner and "The Next Great Champ" when he beat David Pareja.

Professional boxing record

References

External links
 

1977 births
Living people
Participants in American reality television series
American male boxers
African-American boxers
Boxers from Alabama
People from Troy, Alabama
Super-middleweight boxers
21st-century African-American sportspeople
20th-century African-American sportspeople